Carel Borchaert Voet (1671, Zwolle – 1743, Dordrecht), was an 18th-century flower and insect painter from the Northern Netherlands.

Biography

According to the RKD he became a member of the Confrerie Pictura in the years 1692-1699. He travelled to England in the service of Hans Willem Bentinck, count of Portland. He contributed to his Codex Bentingiana, a catalog of the flowers and insects in his garden called Bentingiana, that was later used as a source for Leonard Plukenet's Phytographia in 1692. 
He moved to Dordrecht in 1702 where he stayed.

References

Carel Borchaert Voet on Artnet

1671 births
1743 deaths
18th-century Dutch painters
18th-century Dutch male artists
Dutch male painters
People from Zwolle
Painters from The Hague